Uropterygius polyspilus is a moray eel found in coral reefs in the Pacific and Indian Oceans. It is commonly known as the large-spotted snake moray.

References

polyspilus
Fish described in 1909